The Dial was an American magazine published intermittently from 1840 to 1929. In its first form, from 1840 to 1844, it served as the chief publication of the Transcendentalists. From the 1880s to 1919 it was revived as a political review and literary criticism magazine. From 1920 to 1929 it was an influential outlet for modernist literature in English.

Transcendentalist journal

Members of the Hedge Club began talks for creating a vehicle for their essays and reviews in philosophy and religion in October 1839. Other influential journals, including the North American Review and the Christian Examiner refused to accept their work for publication. Orestes Brownson proposed utilizing his recently established periodical Boston Quarterly Review but members of the club decided a new publication was a better solution. Frederick Henry Hedge, Theodore Parker, and Ralph Waldo Emerson were originally considered for the editor role. On October 20, 1839, Margaret Fuller officially accepted the editorship, though she was unable to begin work on the publication until the first week of 1840. George Ripley served as the managing editor. Its first issue was published in July 1840 with an introduction by Emerson calling it a "Journal in a new spirit". In this first form, the magazine remained in publication until 1844. Emerson wrote to Fuller on August 4, 1840, of his ambitions for the magazine:

The title of the journal, which was suggested by Amos Bronson Alcott, intended to evoke a sundial. The connotations of the image were expanded upon by Emerson in concluding his editorial introduction to the journal's first issue:

The Dial was heavily criticized, even by Transcendentalists. Ripley said, "They had expected hoofs and horns while it proved as gentle as any sucking dove". The journal was never financially stable. In 1843, Elizabeth Peabody, acting as business manager, noted that the journal's income was not covering the cost of printing and that subscriptions totaled just over two hundred. It ceased publication in April 1844. Horace Greeley, in the May 25 issue of the New-York Weekly Tribune, reported it as an end to the "most original and thoughtful periodical ever published in this country".

Political review and literary criticism magazine
After a one-year revival in 1860, the third incarnation of The Dial, this time as a journal of both politics and literary criticism, began publication in 1880. This version of the magazine was founded by Francis Fisher Browne in Chicago. Browne claimed it to be a legitimate offspring of Emerson and Fuller's Dial. Browne would serve as its editor for over three decades. He envisioned his new literary journal in the genteel tradition of its predecessor, containing book reviews, articles about current trends in the sciences and humanities, and politics, as well as long lists of current book titles. It was in this form that Margaret Anderson, soon to be founder of The Little Review, worked for the magazine. Although Chicago was a city reputedly indifferent to literary pursuits, The Dial attained national prominence, absorbing The Chap-Book in 1898.

Francis Browne died in 1913 after elevating the magazine by its unswerving standard in design and content. Control of the magazine shifted to his siblings, and under their control, the magazine lost prominence because they lacked the editing and managing abilities of Francis. In 1916, rather than continuing the failing magazine, the Browne family sold The Dial to Martyn Johnson, who "set the magazine on a liberal, even increasingly radical course in politics and the arts as well as in literature." Although The Dial was, at the time, a reputable magazine with a noted Midwestern influence, Johnson decided to move to New York in 1918 to distance the magazine from the Midwest and reconnect with the city because many of the magazine's new editors had connections there. Johnson's Dial soon encountered financial problems, but future editor Scofield Thayer, heir to a New England wool fortune, invested in the magazine. During this time, Thayer met Randolph Bourne, a contributing editor to The Dial. Bourne's steadfast pacifism and aesthetic views of art inspired Thayer who reflected these philosophies in his life. After contributing to The Dial and sinking large sums of money into the company, Thayer hoped for some editorial control of the magazine. Johnson, however, would not yield any responsibilities, causing Thayer to leave the magazine in 1918.

During the latter stages of World War I, Bourne's followers at The Dial became opponents of John Dewey who advocated absolute violence as the sole means of ending the war. This, coupled with increasing financial problems, nearly ended the magazine. These internal conflicts over ideology and finances caused Johnson to put the magazine up for sale in 1919. Thayer had teamed with a friend from Harvard, James Sibley Watson, Jr., to buy The Dial late in 1919. Watson, being an heir to the Western Union fortune, had ample money to buy the magazine with Thayer.

Modernist literary magazine
In 1920, Scofield Thayer and Dr. James Sibley Watson. Jr. re-established The Dial as a literary magazine, the form for which it was most successful and best known. Under Watson's and Thayer's sway The Dial published remarkably influential artwork, poetry and fiction, including William Butler Yeats' "The Second Coming" and the first United States publication of T. S. Eliot's The Waste Land. The Waste Land, however, barely made it to the pages of The Dial. Ezra Pound, the magazine's foreign advisor/editor (1920–1923), suggested the poem for publication. Thayer, having never seen the work, approved it for the magazine based on this suggestion and because Eliot had been Thayer's classmate at Oxford. Eliot became frustrated, however, at the small amount The Dial intended to pay for the poem. Thayer was relieved that Eliot was about to pull the deal off the table because he was weary of Eliot's style. Negotiations continued, however, until The Dial paid Eliot $2130 for the poem, by also awarding the magazine's second annual prize, which carried an award of $2,000 (£450). This was a substantial amount, approximately equal to Eliot's 1922 salary at Lloyds Bank (£500, $2,215), and worth about $90,000 in 2006 dollars.

The first year of the Watson/Thayer Dial alone saw the appearance of Sherwood Anderson, Djuna Barnes, Kenneth Burke, William Carlos Williams, Hart Crane, E. E. Cummings, Charles Demuth, Kahlil Gibran, Gaston Lachaise, Amy Lowell, Marianne Moore, Ezra Pound, Arthur Wilson later known as Winslow Wilson, Odilon Redon, Bertrand Russell, Carl Sandburg, Van Wyck Brooks, and W. B. Yeats.

The Dial published art as well as poetry and essays, with artists ranging from Vincent van Gogh, Renoir, Henri Matisse, and Odilon Redon, through Oskar Kokoschka, Constantin Brâncuși, and Edvard Munch, and Georgia O'Keeffe and Joseph Stella. The magazine also reported on the cultural life of European capitals, writers included T. S. Eliot from London, John Eglinton initially from Dublin, but after 1922 reporting on Dublin from a self-imposed exile in England, Ezra Pound from Paris, Thomas Mann from Germany, and Hugo von Hofmannsthal from Vienna.

Scofield Thayer was the magazine's editor-in-chief from 1920 to 1926, and Watson was publisher and president from 1920 until its end in 1929. Several managing editors worked for The Dial during the twenties: Gilbert Seldes (1922–23), Kenneth Burke (1923), Alyse Gregory (1923–25). Due to Thayer's nervous breakdown, he left The Dial in 1925 and formally resigned in 1926. Marianne Moore, a contributor to The Dial and advisor, became Managing Editor in 1925. She became the magazine's editor-in-chief upon Thayer's resignation.

Ernest Hemingway published his poem The Soul of Spain With McAlmon and Bird the Publishers in the German magazine Der Querschnitt where he directly attacked The Dial in 1924. Der Querschnitt was seen as a German counterpart of The Dial by some.

Scofield Thayer's mental health continued to deteriorate, and he was hospitalized in 1927. Around this time, Watson began to delve into avant garde films, leaving Moore to her own auspices as editor-in-chief. Toward the end of the magazine's run, the staff felt that they were staying on because of an obligation to continue rather than a drive to be a strong, modern magazine. When the magazine ended in 1929, the staff was confident that the precedent they set would be carried on by other magazines.

In 1981, the Worcester Art Museum in Worcester, Massachusetts, held an exhibition titled "The Dial": Arts and Letters in the 1920s and published a catalog titled The Dial: Arts and Letters in the 1920s: An anthology of writings from The Dial magazine, 1920-29, Edited by Gaye L. Brown.

The Dial Award
In June 1921, Thayer and Watson announced the creation of the Dial Award, $2000 to be presented to one of its contributors, acknowledging their "service to letters" in hopes of providing the artist with "leisure through which at least one artist may serve God (or go to the Devil) according to his own lights." The first of these awards was granted in January 1922 to Sherwood Anderson for work he had published in the magazine in 1921. Eight Dial Awards were given in all.
 1921. Sherwood Anderson
 1922. T. S. Eliot
 1923. Van Wyck Brooks
 1924. Marianne Moore
 1925. E. E. Cummings
 1926. William Carlos Williams
 1927. Ezra Pound
 1928. Kenneth Burke

Notable contributors by volume
In its literary phase, The Dial was published monthly. Notable contributors for each of its volumes (six-month intervals) are summarized below.

 Vol. 68 (January–June 1920) Sherwood Anderson, Djuna Barnes, Randolph Bourne, Kenneth Burke, Malcolm Cowley, Hart Crane, E. E. Cummings, Charles Demuth, Kahlil Gibran, Gaston Lachaise, Amy Lowell, Edna St. Vincent Millay, Marianne Moore, Ezra Pound, Odilon Redon, Paul Rosenfeld, Bertrand Russell, Carl Sandburg, Gilbert Seldes (Sganarelle), Van Wyck Brooks, W. B. Yeats
 Vol. 69 (July–December 1920) Richard Aldington, Julien Benda, Kenneth Burke, Joseph Conrad, Stewart Davis, T. S. Eliot, Ford Madox Ford, Waldo Frank, Paul Gauguin, Remy de Gourmont, James Joyce, Henry McBride, Ezra Pound, Marcel Proust, Arthur Rimbaud, Vincent van Gogh, William Carlos Williams, William Butler Yeats
 Vol. 70 (January–June 1921) Richard Aldington, Sherwood Anderson, Johan Bojer, Jean Cocteau, E. E. Cummings, John Dos Passos, T. S. Eliot, Kahlil Gibran, Remy de Gourmont, Ford Maddox Ford, Gaston Lachaise, D. H. Lawrence, Wyndham Lewis, Vachel Lindsay, Mina Loy, Thomas Mann, Henry McBride, George Moore, Marianne Moore, Edwin Arlington Robinson, Paul Rosenfeld, Gilbert Seldes, Arthur Wilson later known as Winslow Wilson
 Vol. 71 (July–December 1921) Sherwood Anderson, Padraic Colum, Arthur Dove, Anatole France, D. H. Lawrence, Wyndham Lewis, Amy Lowell, Marianne Moore, J. Middleton Murry, Pablo Picasso, Ezra Pound, Logan Pearsall Smith, Arthur Schnitzler, Max Weber, William Butler Yeats
 Vol. 72 (January–June 1922) Conrad Aiken, Sherwood Anderson, Louis Aragon, Alexander Archipenko, Maxwell Bodenheim, Ivan Bunin, Kenneth Burke, Ananda Coomaraswamy, Hart Crane, Thomas Jewell Craven, S. Foster Damon, E. E. Cummings, Alfeo Faggi, Hermann Hesse, A. L. Kroeber, D. H. Lawrence, Henri Matisse, Henry McBride, Raymond Mortimer, Paul Rosenfeld, Henri Rousseau, Bertrand Russell, Carl Sandburg, George Santayana, Gilbert Seldes, May Sinclair, Felix Timmermans, Paul Valéry
 Vol. 73 (July–December 1922) Sherwood Anderson, Constantin Brâncuși, Marc Chagall, John Dos Passos, John Eglinton, T. S. Eliot, Elie Faure, Duncan Grant, Hermann Hesse, Hugo von Hofmannsthal, D. H. Lawrence, Mina Loy, Franz Marc, Henri Matisse, Thomas Mann, Raymond Mortimer, Paul Rosenfeld, Arthur Schnitzler, Wallace Stevens, Edmund Wilson, William Butler Yeats
 Vol. 74 (January–June 1923) Conrad Aiken, Sherwood Anderson, Malcolm Cowley, E. E. Cummings, Stuart Davis, John Dewey, Gerhart Hauptmann, Hugo von Hofmannsthal, Marie Laurencin, D. H. Lawrence, Thomas Mann, Katherine Mansfield, Frans Masereel, Henry McBride, George Moore, Marianne Moore, Raymond Mortimer, Pablo Picasso, Ezra Pound, Paul Rosenfeld, Henri Rousseau, Edmund Wilson, William Butler Yeats, Stefan Zweig
 Vol. 75 (July–December 1923) Djuna Barnes, Pierre Bonnard, Van Wyck Brooks, Karel Čapek, Adolphe Dehn, André Derain, Roger Fry, Alyse Gregory, Knut Hamsun, Manuel Komroff, Alfred Kreymborg, Julius Meier-Graefe, Marie Laurencin, George Moore, Paul Morand, Luigi Pirandello, Bertrand Russell, Edward Sapir, Georges Seurat, Jean Toomer, William Carlos Williams, Edmund Wilson, Virginia Woolf
 Vol. 76 (January–June 1924) Marc Chagall, Padraic Colum, E. E. Cummings, Jacob Epstein, Élie Faure, E. M. Forster, Maxim Gorky, Gaston Lachaise, Marie Laurencin, Aristide Maillol, Heinrich Mann, Thomas Mann, John Marin, H. L. Mencken, Edvard Munch, J. Middleton Murry, Pablo Picasso, Raffaello Piccolli, Herbert Read, Edwin Arlington Robinson, Herbert J. Seligmann, Miguel de Unamuno, Maurice de Vlaminck, Stefan Zweig
 Vol. 77 (July–December 1924) Ernst Barlach, Clive Bell, Marc Chagall, Thomas Craven, Adolphe Dehn, André Derain, José Ortega y Gasset, Maxim Gorky, Duncan Grant, Marianne Moore, Edwin Muir, Jules Romains, Bertrand Russell, Carl Sandburg, Herbert J. Seligmann, Georges Seurat, Logan Pearsall Smith, Oswald Spengler, Leo Stein, Wallace Stevens, Scofield Thayer, Edmund Wilson, Virginia Woolf
 Vol. 78 (January–June 1925) Sherwood Anderson, Clive Bell, T. S. Eliot, Hugo von Hofmannsthal, Henri Matisse, Henry McBride, Marianne Moore, Paul Morand, Raymond Mortimer, Lewis Mumford, Edvard Munch, Georgia O'Keeffe, Auguste Rodin, Paul Rosenfeld, George Santayana, Oswald Spengler, William Carlos Williams, Virginia Woolf
 Vol. 79 (July–December 1925) Thomas Hart Benton, Pierre Bonnard, Kenneth Burke, Joseph Campbell, Thomas Craven, Malcolm Cowley, E. E. Cummings, Charles Demuth, Dostoevsky, Arthur Dove, Élie Faure, Waldo Frank, Roger Fry, Eduard von Keyserling, Marie Laurencin, D. H. Lawrence, Mabel Dodge Luhan, Thomas Mann, Henry McBride, Marianne Moore, Georgia O'Keeffe, Logan Pearsall Smith, Arthur Schnitzler, Édouard Vuillard
 Vol. 80 (January–June 1926) Alexander Archipenko, Hart Crane, E. E. Cummings, Adolf Dehn, Alfeo Faggi, Anatole France, Waldo Frank, Robert Hillyer, Augustus John, Nikolai Leskov, Aristide Maillol, Henry McBride, Pablo Picasso, Rainer Maria Rilke, Paul Rosenfeld, Henri Rousseau, George Saintsbury, Gilbert Seldes, Scofield Thayer, Paul Valéry, Yvor Winters
 Vol. 81 (July–December 1926) Paul Cézanne, Hart Crane, Thomas Craven, John Eglinton, Roger Fry, Marie Laurencin, D. H. Lawrence, Thomas Mann, Henri Matisse, Paul Morand, Pablo Picasso, Raffaello Piccolli, Auguste Renoir, I. A. Richards, Bertrand Russell, George Saintsbury, Herman George Scheffauer, Gilbert Seldes, Gertrude Stein, William Carlos Williams, William Butler Yeats
 Vol. 82 (January–June 1927) Conrad Aiken, Constantin Brâncuși, Paul Cézanne, Hart Crane, Benedetto Croce, T. S. Eliot, Ramon Fernandez, Leon Srabian Herald, Winslow Homer, Oskar Kokoschka, Thomas Mann, Henry McBride, Edvard Munch, Paul Rosenfeld, George Saintsbury, George Santayana, Meridel Le Sueur, Sacheverell Sitwell, Vincent van Gogh, William Carlos Williams, Jack Yeats
 Vol. 83 (July–December 1927) Conrad Aiken, Paul Cézanne, Malcolm Cowley, Hart Crane, E. E. Cummings, André Derain, Marie Laurencin, D. H. Lawrence, Raymond Mortimer, Pablo Picasso, Bertrand Russell, Leo Stein, Charles Trueblood, Paul Valéry, Vincent van Gogh, William Butler Yeats
 Vol. 84 (January–June 1928) Conrad Aiken, Kenneth Burke, Kwei Chen, Padraic Colum, T. S. Eliot, Robert Hillyer, Wyndham Lewis, Henry McBride, Pablo Picasso, Ezra Pound, Llewelyn Powys, Odilon Redon, William Carlos Williams, William Butler Yeats
 Vol. 85 (July–December 1928) Conrad Aiken, Kenneth Burke, Kwei Chen, Paul Claudel, Padraic Colum, T. S. Eliot, Waldo Frank, Maxim Gorki, Philip Littell, Aristide Maillol, Frans Masereel, Elie Nadelman, Pablo Picasso, Ezra Pound, Logan Pearsall Smith, Joseph Stella, Jean Toomer, Charles K. Trueblood, Max Weber, William Carlos Williams, Louis Zukofsky
 Vol. 86 (January–July 1929) Conrad Aiken, Kenneth Burke, Hart Crane, Padraic Colum, Maxim Gorki, Duncan Grant, Stanley Kunitz, D. H. Lawrence, Aristide Maillol, Pablo Picasso, Ezra Pound, John Cowper Powys, Llewelyn Powys, Bertrand Russell, William Carlos Williams, Paul Valéry, Felix Albrecht Harta

References

External links

 History of The Dial at American Transcendentalism Web, Virginia Commonwealth University
 
 The Dial (Thoreau's Life & Writings at the Thoreau Institute at Walden Woods)
  
 The Dial archives - Full volume list with dates and links from the University of Pennsylvania library to issues hosted by the Internet Archive.

Monthly magazines published in the United States
Defunct literary magazines published in the United States
Magazines established in 1840
Magazines disestablished in 1929
Transcendentalism